"The Old Songs" is a song written by David Pomeranz and Buddy Kaye and was featured in Pomeranz's 1980 album, The Truth of Us. In 1999, the song was re-recorded again in Pomeranz's 1999 album, Born for You: His Best and More.

Barry Manilow version

A year after its release, American singer Barry Manilow would later record the track for his 1981 album, "If I Should Love Again".

"The Old Songs" peaked at number fifteen on the U.S. Billboard Hot 100 and was Manilow's eleventh number one on the Billboard Adult Contemporary chart, spending three weeks at number one.

Chart performance

Weekly charts

Year-end charts

See also
List of number-one adult contemporary singles of 1981 (U.S.)

References

1980 songs
1981 songs
1981 singles
Barry Manilow songs
Songs written by David Pomeranz
Songs with lyrics by Buddy Kaye
Songs about music
Arista Records singles
Songs about nostalgia